The Commercial Rents (Coronavirus) Bill of the Parliament of the United Kingdom aims to help commercial landlords and tenants in resolving rent arrears that have arisen as a result of the COVID-19 pandemic.

Law is passed

The bill became law on 24 March 2022  The copy of the Legislation can be read here

Background
During the COVID-19 pandemic, many businesses were mandated to close in full or in part by Government. 
At the same time, the government introduced an eviction moratorium and protection for thousands of commercial tenants. 
As a result, many businesses have accrued debts, estimated to be over £6bn as of March 2021,  
As the restrictions ended on July 18, 2021, and in an effort to protect a large number of businesses from eviction and reduce the number of jobs at risk of insolvency, regulatory intervention has been proposed for England and Wales.
This was announced by Government on 16 June 2021  the intention is to ringfence unpaid rent that had built up when a business has had to remain closed during the pandemic. Landlords are expected to make allowances for the ringfenced rent arrears and share the financial impact with their tenants. The rent from the closure periods is now defined as protected rent debt in the bill.

The bill was published on Nov 9th 2021 

The bill introduces a mandatory code of practice for commercial landlords and tenants to follow 

The bill gives protection for those operating under a businesses tenancy from rent debt recovery, and if no agreement can be reached, that the matter can then be resolved by arbitration.

The arbitration award can alter the principle sum owed under a business tenancy and give business tenants time to pay (up to 24 months).
The act also proposes to alter the Arbitration Act 1996  under Schedule 1 of the bill.

New legal terms introduced
"Protected Rent Debt", which is defined as being (as well as rent) the interest, services, and insurance charged to a tenant that accrued during the relevant periods below.

"Relevant period", which is defined as being, from 2 pm March 21, 2020 up to 11.55 pm 18 July 2021 (ENGLAND only) 6 am 7 August (2021 WALES only)

"Adversely affected by Coronavirus", which is defined as, occurring during a "relevant period" and that any part of the business or the premises was subject to a closure requirement, it is not necessary for the whole building to have been closed.

The bill also outlines the period of time (6 months) in which either a Landlord or Tenant can make a reference to arbitration.

References

2021 in British law
Proposed laws of the United Kingdom